Localized lichen myxedematosus is a group of skin condition caused by fibroblasts producing abnormally large amounts of mucopolysaccharides, a disease for which there is no treatment.

See also 
 Papular mucinosis
 List of cutaneous conditions

References

External links 

Mucinoses